Muhammad Younus Soomro is a Pakistani politician who has been a member of the Provincial Assembly of Sindh since August 2018.

Political career

He was elected to the Provincial Assembly of Sindh as a candidate of Tehreek-e-Labbaik Pakistan from Constituency PS-107 (Karachi South-I) in 2018 Pakistani general election.

References

Living people
Tehreek-e-Labbaik Pakistan politicians
Sindh MPAs 2018–2023
Year of birth missing (living people)